Stevie McCrorie (born 23 March 1985) is a Scottish singer-songwriter. He is best known as a firefighter who won the fourth series of the BBC television singing competition The Voice UK in 2015, where he auditioned with Kodaline's "All I Want", with all four coaches turning their chairs for him. His debut single, "Lost Stars", was released the day following his win, peaking at number one on the Scottish Singles Chart and number six on the UK Singles Chart. After winning The Voice, he performed at T in The Park in 2015.

In January 2016, McCrorie released his second album, Big World which reached number four on the Scottish Albums Chart and number thirty-five on the UK Albums Chart. McCrorie and his record label parted company soon thereafter and McCrorie resumed his former career as a firefighter whilst still touring and releasing music as an independent artist.

As of 2019, McCrorie is the most successful artist to emerge victorious from The Voice UK. His winners single, "Lost Stars" is currently the highest charting and best-selling single in the United Kingdom from a The Voice UK winner, charting at number six on the UK Singles Chart and selling 62,000 copies.

Early life
Stevie McCrorie was born in Stirling and spent his formative years in Denny, Falkirk. He was educated at St Modan's High School, Stirling.

Before winning The Voice UK, he was a firefighter of the Scottish Fire and Rescue Service in 2015 and was nicknamed "The Hero" during the competition.

Career

2010–15: These Old Traditions
McCrorie started his singing and recording career with the band 'Scruffy Kid' which led to gaining second place in the Scottish Schools battle of the bands. He was then in bands such as 'Feelings Pass', 'The Goodnight Story', 'CITY' and 'Voom Club' before refining the band name to Stevie and the Moon, releasing the double A-side single, "Wolves and Rainbows" and later releasing These Old Traditions in 2010. Stevie and the Moon disbanded a day after one final show at Falkirks 20 Rocks on 16 June 2013. Before the final show, McCrorie enjoyed success playing T in the Park festival 2010, Wickerman festival, BBC introducing and Radio 1 live lounge performances and interviews with BBC Radio 1's Jo Whiley.

2015–16: The Voice UK
In 2015, McCrorie auditioned for the fourth series of The Voice UK performing Kodaline's "All I Want", with all four coaches turning for him. He eventually chose to join Ricky Wilson's team. During the battle rounds, he battled Tim Arnold singing Imagine Dragons' "Demons", and McCrorie won the Battle. During the Knockout Rounds, McCrorie performed U2's "I Still Haven't Found What I'm Looking For". McCrorie was then through to the live shows. During the first live show, he performed Cyndi Lauper's "All Through the Night". McCrorie received the Team Ricky "fast pass" and was saved. The other Team Ricky artists were Emmanuel Nwamadi, who advanced to the next live show via the public vote and Autumn Sharif, who did not advance to the second live show. During the second live show, McCrorie performed Leona Lewis' "Bleeding Love" and advanced to the Live Final along with teammate Nwamadi. During the live final, he performed "I'll Stand By You", "Get Back", "All I Want" and the winner's single "Lost Stars". On 4 April 2015 on the live show, it was announced that McCrorie was the winner of The Voice UK 2015. He had beaten the only other remaining contestant, opera singer Lucy O'Byrne.

2016–2019: Big World and touring
On 5 April 2015, the day after he won the show, McCrorie released his winner's single, a cover of "Lost Stars", written by Gregg Alexander, Danielle Brisebois, Nick Lashley and Nck Southwood, via digital download. The song reached number 1 in his native Scotland and six in the UK.

His second single, "My Heart Never Lies" was released in November 2015 along with an accompanying music video. It reached number 51 on the Scottish Singles Chart.

His first album since winning The Voice UK, Big World, was released on 8 January 2016. The album reached number four in Scotland number 35 on the UK Albums Chart. To promote the album, he made an appearance on The Voice in 2016 on the first live shows, and performed "My Heart Never Lies". Following the performance, Big World re-entered the Scottish Albums Chart at number 15 and UK Albums Chart at number 70, while My Heart Never Lies re-entered at a new peak of 45 on the Scottish Singles Chart.

In April 2016, McCrorie and music PR company APB parted ways and he returned to his former career as a firefighter. In August 2016, McCrorie announced via Facebook that his contract with Decca Records had expired.

McCrorie revealed to Radio Times in April 2017 that he is still pursuing a career in music as an independent artist and continues to write songs and perform live. In December 2017, McCrorie released a 3-track EP independently and an accompanying music video for the song "I Am Alive", which subsequently entered the official Scottish charts at number 69.

2019–present: Days Like These
On 27 December 2019, McCrorie released an extended play, Days Like These, via his own independent record label. The extended play featured five songs, including versions of "I Still Haven't Found What I'm Looking For" by U2 and "Dreams" by Fleetwood Mac.

Personal life
McCrorie is married to Amy Laverty McCrorie and they have two daughters, Bibi and Sunny. He has three siblings, Michael, Paul and sister Nadia.

Discography

Albums

Singles

References

External links
 Official website
 Stevie McCrorie on YouTube

Living people
21st-century Scottish male singers
People from Denny, Falkirk
The Voice (franchise) winners
The Voice UK contestants
1985 births
People educated at St Modan's High School